Guaro is a municipality in the province of Málaga in Andalusia southern Spain. It has a population of 2,228. It belongs to the Valle de Guadalhorce comarca and is 44 kilometres from the provincial capital of Málaga and 20 kilometres from Marbella.

Located in a fertile land for fruit: almonds and olives, between the Rio Grande valley and the mountains, Guaro is the entrance to the Sierra de las Nieves Natural Park, declared a Biosphere Reserve by UNESCO and next to the third national park in Andalusia.

Geography
Guaro is at an altitude of 354 metres above sea level near the Sierra de Mijas. The land area is 22 square kilometres. Guaro's main economical activities are olive and almond agriculture, along with other traditional irrigated crops, and oddly-enough, as of 2006 the number of women with work contracts doubled that of men.

History
Prehistoric remains have been found dating back to the earliest humans in the area in prehistory, although the nucleus of the population is found with the entry of the Arabs in the south of the peninsula.

The first settlement in the area dates from Arabic times and was located at the place known as Old Guaro, at the feet of a tower that once was part of the line of fortifications of Guadalhorce valley. The municipality was conquered by the Catholic Monarchs in 1485. Guaro became an independent village on 1614 by decree of King Philip IV of Spain. The city is notable for its typical Andalus streets lined with white houses festooned with flowers. Its main monument is Saint Michel's parish, built in the 16th century and reformed in the early 17th century by Pedro Días de Palacios, that exhibits a square, two-bodied tower and no lateral vessels.

Monuments & Museum

The parish church of San Miguel Arcángel is one of the most important monuments in Guaro. This temple is located in the center of the old town a few meters from the Town Hall and the San Isidro Labrador Fountain. It was built on an old mosque in 1505 and renovated up to two times. It has a Latin cross plan without the side naves, on the facade you will find the image of San Miguel and, on its right, the bell tower.

Two other outstanding religious buildings are the hermitages of Cruz del Puerto and San Isidro, the latter located next to the Rio Grande in a place of eucalyptus. From the Cruz del Puerto hermitage, the panoramic views of the surroundings are exceptional, and inside you will find one of the most revered images by the neighbors, the Cristo de Limpias.

Al-Andalus Cultural Center and its Ethnographic Oil Museum, which houses an Arab oil press from the 12th century. The objective of this space is to highlight the value of the municipality as a traditional olive producer since the Al-Andalus period. Also on the same theme, the Marmolejo Oil Museum has a collection of tools and machinery from the old Guaro mills.

Events
The town of Guaro holds a very special event every year: the Luna Mora Festival. Over two days, the town's streets are lit up with over 25,000 candles and Arabic and Andalusian music as the backdrop.

The Luna Mora Festival in Guaro also includes a full programme of activities: workshops, exhibitions, story telling for the kids, bazaars and food markets. There is also a series of concerts held in the Luna Mora Auditorium. 

All under the light of the candles that take visitors into the Andalusian past of the town, creating a magical atmosphere.

References 
https://web.archive.org/web/20060501131443/http://www.juntadeandalucia.es/iea/sima/htm/sm29058.htm
https://web.archive.org/web/20071113034032/http://www.guaro.es/inicio.asp
Guaro Article on Spanish Wikipedia

Municipalities in the Province of Málaga